Northern Pole (北极 in Simplified Chinese, běi jí in Pinyin) is a traditional Chinese asterism found in the Purple Forbidden enclosure (紫微垣 in Simplified Chinese, zǐ wēi yuán in Pinyin). It consists of five stars found in the modern constellations of Ursa Minor and Camelopardalis and represents the five stars of the North Pole. During the Qing dynasty, a total of four stars from the constellation Ursa Minor was added to the asterism.

Astronomy in China